Santiago Jorge Kuhl (born 21 October 1981 in Buenos Aires) is an Argentine footballer.

References
 Clausura 2007 Statistics at Terra.com.ar 
 Swiss Challenge League 2007/08 Statistics at Eurosoccer.ch 
 2003-04 Statistics at LFP.es 
 FC Locarno profile 

1981 births
Living people
Footballers from Buenos Aires
Argentine footballers
Association football midfielders
Argentinos Juniors footballers
FC Baden players
FC Luzern players
AD Ceuta footballers
CD Leganés players
FC Locarno players
Argentine Primera División players
Argentine expatriate footballers
Argentine expatriate sportspeople in Spain
Expatriate footballers in Switzerland
Expatriate footballers in Spain
Argentine people of German descent